Climacturia is urinary incontinence at the moment of sexual climax (orgasm).  It can be a result of radical prostatectomy to treat prostate cancer. It is uncomfortable at times, but usually harmless.

References 

Sexology
Urology
Oncology